Denis Viktorovich Kravtsov (born 18 March 1990) is a Russian former football midfielder.

Club career
He made his debut in the Russian Second Division for FC Amur-2010 Blagoveshchensk on 7 September 2011 in a game against FC KUZBASS Kemerovo.

References

External links
 Career summary by sportbox.ru

1990 births
People from Ulan-Ude
Living people
Russian footballers
Association football midfielders
FC Torpedo Moscow players
FC Amkar Perm players
FC Sfîntul Gheorghe players
Moldovan Super Liga players
Russian expatriate footballers
Expatriate footballers in Moldova
Sportspeople from Buryatia